Gemella sanguinis is a species of bacteria within the genus Gemella. Strains of this species were originally isolated from samples of human blood, and in one case from a patient with endocarditis. Additional cases of endocarditis associated with G. sanguinis infections have been reported.

References

External links
Type strain of Gemella sanguinis at BacDive -  the Bacterial Diversity Metadatabase

Bacillales
Bacteria described in 1998